The canton of Beaumes-de-Venise is a French former administrative division in the department of Vaucluse and region Provence-Alpes-Côte d'Azur. It had 5,519 inhabitants (2012). It was disbanded following the French canton reorganisation which came into effect in March 2015.

Composition
The communes in the canton of Beaumes-de-Venise:
Beaumes-de-Venise
Gigondas
Lafare
La Roque-Alric
Sablet
Suzette
Vacqueyras

References

Beaumes-de-Venise
2015 disestablishments in France
States and territories disestablished in 2015